Dashiin Byambasüren (born 20 June 1942 in Binder, Khentii) is a Mongolian politician who was Prime Minister of Mongolia from 11 September 1990 to  21 July 1992, the first one to be appointed by a democratically elected parliament, as a member of the Mongolian People's Revolutionary Party. He comes from a Buryat background. He is married with six children.

Political career 
An economist, Byambasüren served as the chief of the State Statistical Office and the Institute of Management, although his influence initially waned after the fall of his mentor Jambyn Batmönkh. By 1989 he had risen to the position of deputy head of the Council of Ministers and after the 1990 elections (which were largely democratic) he was chosen as the final Prime Minister of the Mongolian People's Republic. His ministry was noted as reforming but also as something of a technocracy, featuring a number of former communists who had altered their positions to suit the new mood of the country. However he also developed a reputation for diplomacy, visiting Germany, Belgium and France, as well as Moscow and a first visit by a Mongolian leader to China for over thirty years, during the course of his Premiership. He was succeeded in 1992 by Puntsagiin Jasrai. Byambasüren sought to improve Mongolia's external relations and worked particularly closely with Japan, which, along with the World Bank, pledged $320 million to Mongolia under his premiership.

He left the Mongolian People's Revolutionary Party in October 1992, criticizing its continuing hegemony in the country and its close links to communist parties elsewhere. He went on to form his own pro-democracy group, the Mongolian Democratic Renaissance Party (Mongolyn Ardqilsan Särgään Mandalyn Nam), in 1994.

Other activities 
Later Byambasüren was at the forefront of campaigns to stop archaeologists from digging for the remains of Genghis Khan. Byambasüren attacked both the desecration of sacred ground that the digging caused and the private funding of the initiatives. He has also served as a Professor at the Mongolian Academy of Management and Khan Uul University and President of the Mongolian Development Foundation and participated in the Earth Summit 2002.

References

1942 births
Living people
People from Khentii Province
Buryat people
Mongolian People's Party politicians
Prime Ministers of Mongolia
Mongolian academics